Waimea Intermediate is a co-educational intermediate school in Richmond, Tasman District, New Zealand.

History
Waimea Intermediate opened in 1959 with a roll of 485 students.

Syndicates
Students of Waimea Intermediate are split into six different syndicates, which are named after Māori symbols and their associated meaning/proverb.

 Nīkau — importance of knowledge
 Rangiātea — aiming high
 Tū Tangata — shared knowledge
 Kākano — growth
 Tamanui Te Rā — rays of hope
 Tangaroa — strength and vigilance

References

External links
Official website
Education Review Office Reports

Educational institutions established in 1959
Schools in the Tasman District
Richmond, New Zealand
1959 establishments in New Zealand